The 2013 Mediterranean Games medal table is a list of National Olympic Committees (NOCs) ranked by the number of medals won by their athletes during the 2013 Mediterranean Games, held in Mersin, Turkey, from 20 to 30 June 2013.

Medal table

References

External links
Official website of the Games

Mediterranean Games medal tables
2013 Mediterranean Games